Poggiali is an Italian surname. Notable people with the surname include:

Manuel Poggiali (born 1983), Sanmarinese motorcycle racer
Roberto Poggiali (born 1941), Italian cyclist

See also
39864 Poggiali, main-belt minor planet
Poggioli

Italian-language surnames